Pectineal  may refer to:

Musculi pectinati of the heart, also known as pectinate muscles
Pectineus muscle, an adductor of the thigh
Pectineal line (femur)
Pectineal line (pubis), also known as the pecten pubis
Pectineal ligament, or Cooper's Ligament, located along the pecten pubis